Alessandro Murgia (born 9 August 1996) is an Italian footballer who plays as a midfielder for  club SPAL.

Club career

Lazio
Murgia made his debut for Lazio in the 2016–17 season on 17 September 2016 in a 3–0 home win over Pescara. He scored his first goal for the club on 23 October 2016 in a 2–2 away draw against Torino.

On 13 August 2017, Murgia scored the winning goal of the Supercoppa Italiana against Juventus with a final score of 3–2. On 14 September, Murgia started in his first match in European competitions, and scored the match winner of a 3–2 away victory over Vitesse in Lazio's first match of the 2017–18 UEFA Europa League.

Loan to SPAL
On 30 January 2019, Murgia joined to Serie A club SPAL on loan until 30 June 2019.

SPAL
On 12 July 2019, Murgia joined SPAL after 6-month loan, he signed until 2024.

Loan to Perugia
On 31 August 2021, he joined Perugia on loan.

International career
Murgia made his debut with the Italy U21 team on 1 September 2017, in a friendly 3–0 loss against Spain.

Personal life
Murgia is a brother in-law to footballer Andrea Bertolacci who married his sister, Nicole, who is an actress.

Career statistics

Honours
Lazio
Supercoppa Italiana: 2017

References

1996 births
Footballers from Rome
Living people
Association football midfielders
Italian footballers
Italy under-21 international footballers
Italy youth international footballers
S.S. Lazio players
S.P.A.L. players
A.C. Perugia Calcio players
Serie A players
Serie B players